The Ngā Whakarākei O Whātaitai / Wellington Theatre Awards are the main theatre awards in New Zealand's capital city, Wellington established in 2015 after the previous awards sponsor ended their support. They are awarded annually.

The previous awards were called the Chapman Tripp Theatre Awards, established in 1992 and sponsored by law firm Chapman Tripp.

2022 awards 
Presented at a ceremony at the Hannah Playhouse on Sunday 11th December 2022. Funded by Wellington City Council, BATS Theatre, Taki Rua Productions, Circa Theatre and Playmarket.

2020 awards 
Because of the massive disruption and closure to performing arts in 2020 caused by COVID-19 the awards took a different approach with awards categories being:

 Theatre Angels - people who've really helped out individuals and collectives, especially over lockdown and have been the spirit of the industry
 Community Award Winners - with the following headings: Twenty Twenty Best Entrance, The Genuine Good Guy Award, Te Auaha Best Lockdown Mentor Award, The # Pivot to Digital Award
 Ghost Light Award Winners - to acknowledge those who used their skills to not just tend to our garden, but grow it, weed it, help us not just get through a difficult time, but used their skills and platform, as an opportunity to shed light on practises and customs no longer working for us, as practitioners, and as people.

In addition in 2020 there was the usual Mayoral Significant Contribution to Theatre which went to Carolyn Henwood.

2019 awards 
The 2019 awards ceremony was held on Sunday 8 December at Shed 6 on the Wellington waterfront. Stella Reid was MC.

2018 awards 
The 2018 awards ceremony was held at Te Papa on Sunday 9 December, MCed by Jo Randerson. The event had a theme honouring 125 years of women's suffrage.

2017 awards 
The 2017 awards ceremony was held on Sunday 10 December at St James Theatre, Wellington, and MCed for a third year by James Nokise. The Mayoral Award was presented by Justin Lester.

2016 awards 
The 2016 awards ceremony was held on Sunday 11 December at Te Whaea, hosted by James Nokise.

2015 awards 
The 2015 awards ceremony was held on Sunday 6 December at Circa Theatre, hosted by James Nokise. The biggest winner was All Our Sons by Witi Ihimaera, produced by Taki Rua Productions and Circa Theatre. There were 21 categories of award, awarded as follows:

References 

New Zealand awards
Theatre in New Zealand
New Zealand theatre awards